Haslemere railway station is on the Portsmouth Direct Line, serving the town of Haslemere, Surrey, England.

History
The large car park (to the south) and industrial estate (to the north) were originally large goods sidings. Platform 3 is an addition to the original structure, built in 1938 when the line was electrified.  Until then, Haslemere was just a standard wayside station, but it became steadily busier as commuter traffic from the surrounding countryside grew.  There are now four trains an hour to Waterloo and three to Portsmouth.

The station still has its signal box, complete with the original 1895 forty-seven lever Stevens lever frame, situated on the down platform. It was in regular use until a programme of improvements, starting on 12 February 2022, when the line was shut between Guildford and Petersfield for 9 days, saw its functions taken over by the Basingstoke Railway Operating Centre. The box is an LSWR type 4 design and is a Grade II listed building.

The adjoining Foster's Bridge, over Lower Street, was originally built as a two-track brick arch, but was widened later with a metal girder section.

Since June 2008, a new footbridge with lifts provides disabled access to platforms 2 and 3.

In December 2016, the station received a new decked car park, which added significant parking space at the station.

Services

Platforms
Platform 3 is used to allow northbound fast services to overtake stopping services. Platform 2, generally used by up stopping services, is also used by trains terminating here.

Services
All services at Haslemere are operated by South Western Railway using  and  EMUs.

The typical off-peak service in trains per hour was in 2020:
 4 tph to  via  (2 semi-fast, 2 stopping)

References

External links 

Railway stations in Surrey
DfT Category C2 stations
Former London and South Western Railway stations
Railway stations in Great Britain opened in 1859
Railway stations served by South Western Railway
Haslemere
Grade II listed buildings in Surrey